CompuServe (CompuServe Information Service, also known by its initialism CIS) was an American online service provider, the first major commercial one in the world – described in 1994 as "the oldest of the Big Three information services (the others are Prodigy and America Online)."

It dominated the field during the 1980s and remained a major influence through the mid-1990s. At its peak in the early 1990s, CIS was known for its online chat system, message forums covering a variety of topics, extensive software libraries for most computer platforms, and a series of popular online games, notably MegaWars III and Island of Kesmai. It also was known for its introduction of the GIF format for pictures and as a GIF exchange mechanism.

In 1997, 17 years after H&R Block had acquired CIS, the parent announced its desire to sell the company. A complex deal was worked out with WorldCom acting as a broker, resulting in CIS being sold to AOL. In 2015, Verizon acquired AOL, including its CompuServe division. In 2017, after Verizon completed its acquisition of Yahoo!, CompuServe became part of Verizon's newly formed Oath Inc. subsidiary, which was then spun off as the new Yahoo! company in 2021.

History

Founding
CompuServe was founded in 1969 as Compu-Serv Network, Inc. in Columbus, Ohio, as a subsidiary of Golden United Life Insurance. Their focus was on business customers.

Though Golden United founder Harry Gard Sr.'s son-in-law Jeffrey Wilkins is widely miscredited as the first president of CompuServe, its first president was actually John R. Goltz. Wilkins replaced Goltz as CEO within the first year of operation. Goltz and Wilkins were both graduate students in electrical engineering at the University of Arizona. Other early recruits from the University included Sandy Trevor (inventor of the CompuServe CB Simulator chat system), Doug Chinnock, and Larry Shelley.

The company's objectives were twofold: to provide in-house computer processing support to Golden United Life Insurance; and to develop as an independent business in the computer time-sharing industry, by renting time on its PDP-10 midrange computers during business hours. It was spun off as a separate company in 1975, trading on the NASDAQ under the symbol CMPU.

Concurrently, the company recruited executives who shifted the focus from offering time-sharing services, in which customers wrote their own applications, to one that was focused on packaged applications. The first of these new executives was Robert Tillson, who left Service Bureau Corporation (then a subsidiary of Control Data Corporation, but originally formed as a division of IBM) to become CompuServe's Executive Vice President of Marketing. He then recruited Charles McCall (who followed Jeff Wilkins as CEO, and later became CEO of medical information firm HBO & Co.), Maury Cox (who became CEO after the departure of McCall), and Robert Massey (who followed Cox as CEO).

In 1977, CompuServe's board changed the company's name to CompuServe Incorporated. In 1979, it began "offering a dial-up online information service to consumers." In May 1980, at which time Compuserve had fewer than 1,000 subscribers to its consumer information service, H&R Block acquired the company for $25 million and within four years had grown its subscriber base to around 110,000.

Technology
The original 1969 dial-up technology was fairly simple—the local phone number in Cleveland, for example, was a line connected to a time-division multiplexer that connected via a  leased line to a matched multiplexer in Columbus that was connected to a time-sharing host system. In the earliest buildups, each line terminated on a single machine at CompuServe's host, so different numbers had to be used to reach different computers.

Later, the central multiplexers in Columbus were replaced with PDP-8 minicomputers, and the PDP-8s were connected to a DEC PDP-15 minicomputer that acted as switches so a phone number was not tied to a particular destination host. Finally, CompuServe developed its own packet switching network, implemented on DEC PDP-11 minicomputers acting as network nodes that were installed throughout the US (and later, in other countries) and interconnected. Over time, the CompuServe network evolved into a complicated multi-tiered network incorporating Asynchronous Transfer Mode (ATM), Frame Relay (FR), Internet Protocol (IP) and X.25 technologies.

In 1981, The Times explained CompuServe's technology in one sentence:

CompuServe is offering a video-text-like service permitting personal computer users to retrieve software from the mainframe computer over telephone lines.

The New York Times described them as "the most international of the Big Three" and noted that "it can be reached by a local phone call in more than 700 cities".

CompuServe was also a world leader in other commercial services. One of these was the Financial Services group, which collected and consolidated financial data from myriad data feeds, including CompuStat, Disclosure, I/B/E/S as well as the price/quote feeds from the major exchanges. CompuServe developed extensive screening and reporting tools that were used by many investment banks on Wall Street.

CIS
In 1979, Radio Shack marketed the residential information service MicroNET, in which home users accessed the computers during evening hours, when the CompuServe computers were otherwise idle. Its success prompted CompuServe to drop the MicroNET name in favor of its own. CompuServe's origin was approximately concurrent with that of The Source.

Both services were operating in early 1979, being the first online services. MicroNet was made popular through the Issue 2 of Commodore Disk User (February 1988), which included instructions on how to connect and run MicroNet programs.

By the mid-1980s, CompuServe was one of the largest information and networking services companies, and it was the largest consumer information service. It operated commercial branches in more than 30 US cities, selling primarily network services to major corporations throughout the United States. Consumer accounts could be bought in most computer stores (a box with an instruction manual and a trial account login) and awareness of this service was extremely high. By 1987, the consumer side would be 50% of CompuServe revenues.

The corporate culture was entrepreneurial, encouraging "skunkworks projects". Alexander "Sandy" Trevor secluded himself for a weekend, writing the "CB Simulator", a chat system that soon became one of CIS's most popular features. Instead of hiring employees to manage the forums, they contracted with sysops, who received compensation based on the success of their own forum's boards, libraries, and chat areas.

Newspapers
In July 1980, working with Associated Press, CompuServe began hosting text versions of the Columbus Dispatch, The New York Times, Virginian-Pilot and Ledger Star, The Washington Post, San Francisco Examiner, San Francisco Chronicle, and Los Angeles Times were added in 1981; additional newspapers followed.

Although accessing articles in these newspapers made up 5% of CompuServe's traffic, reading an entire newspaper using this method was impractical; the text of a $0.20 print edition newspaper would take two to six hours to download at a cost of $5 per hour (after 6 p.m.).

Selling connectivity
Another major unit of CompuServe, the CompuServe Network Services, was formed in 1982 to generate revenue by selling connectivity on the nationwide packet network CompuServe had built to support its time-sharing service. CompuServe designed and manufactured its own network processors, based on the DEC PDP-11, and wrote all the software that ran on the network. Often (and erroneously) called an X.25 network, the CompuServe network implemented a mixture of standardized and proprietary layers throughout the network.

One of the proprietary layers was called Adaptive Routing. The Adaptive Routing system implemented two powerful features. One is that the network operated entirely in a self-discovery mode. When a new switch was added to the network by connecting it to a neighbor via a leased telephone circuit, the new switch was discovered and absorbed into the network without explicit configuration. To change the network configuration, all that was needed was to add or remove connections, and the network would automatically reconfigure. The second feature implemented by Adaptive Routing was often talked about in network engineering circles, but was implemented only by CNS  establishing connection paths on the basis of real-time performance measurements. As one circuit became busy, traffic was diverted to alternative paths to prevent overloading and poor performance for users.

While the CNS network was not itself based on the X.25 protocol, the network presented a standard X.25 interface to the outside world, providing dialup connectivity to corporate hosts, and allowing CompuServe to form alliances with private networks Tymnet and Telenet, among others. This gave CompuServe the largest selection of local dial-up phone connections in the world, in an era when network usage charges were expensive, but still lower than long-distance charges. Other networks permitted CompuServe access to still more locations, including international locations, usually with substantial connect-time surcharges. It was common in the early 1980s to pay a $30-per-hour charge to connect to CompuServe, which at the time cost $5 to $6 per hour before factoring in the connect-time surcharges. This resulted in the company being nicknamed CompuSpend, Compu$erve or CI$.

CNS has been the primary supplier of dial-up communications for credit-card authorizations for more than 20 years, a competence developed through its long relationship with Visa International. At the peak of this line of business, CompuServe carried millions of authorization transactions each month, representing several billion dollars of consumer purchase transactions. For many businesses an always-on connection was an extravagance, and a dialup option made better sense. Today this service remains in operation, deeply embedded within Verizon (see below). There are no other competitors remaining in this market.

The company was notable for introducing a number of online services to personal computer users. CompuServe began offering electronic mail capabilities and technical support to commercial customers in 1978 under the name Infoplex, and was also a pioneer in the real-time chat market with its CB Simulator service introduced on February 21, 1980, as the first public, commercial multi-user chat program. Introduced in 1985, EaasySABRE, a customer-accessible extension of the Sabre travel system, made it possible for individuals to find and book airline flights and hotel rooms without the help of a travel agent. CompuServe also introduced a number of online games.

File transfers
Around 1981, CompuServe introduced its CompuServe B protocol, a file-transfer protocol, allowing users to send files to each other. This was later expanded to the higher-performance B+ version, intended for downloads from CIS itself. Although the B+ protocol was not widely supported by other software, it was used by default for some time on CIS itself. The B+ protocol was later extended to include the Host-Micro Interface (HMI), a mechanism for communicating commands and transaction requests to a server application running on the mainframes. HMI could be used by "front end" client software to present a GUI-based interface to CIS, without having to use the error-prone CLI to route commands.

CompuServe began to expand its reach outside the United States. It entered the international arena in Japan in 1986 with Fujitsu and Nissho Iwai, and developed a Japanese-language version of CompuServe called NIFTY-Serve in 1989. In 1993, CompuServe Hong Kong was launched in a joint venture with Hutchison Telecom and was able to acquire 50,000 customers before the dial-up ISP frenzy. Between 1994 and 1995 Fujitsu and CompuServe co-developed WorldsAway, an interactive virtual world. As of 2014 the original world that launched on CompuServe in 1995, known as the Dreamscape, is still operating.

In the late 1980s, it was possible to log on to CompuServe via worldwide X.25 packet switching networks, which bridged onto CompuServe's existing US-based network. Gradually it introduced its own direct dial-up access network in many countries, a more economical solution. With its network expansion, CompuServe also extended the marketing of its commercial services, opening branches in London and Munich.

Internet
CompuServe was the first online service to offer Internet connectivity, albeit with limited access, as early as 1989, when it connected its proprietary e-mail service to allow incoming and outgoing messages to be exchanged with Internet-based e-mail addresses.

In the early 1990s, CompuServe had hundreds of thousands of users visiting its thousands of moderated forums, forerunners to the discussion sites on the Web.  (Like the Web, many forums were managed by independent producers who then administered the forum and recruited moderators, called sysops.) Among these were many in which hardware and software companies offered customer support. This broadened the audience from primarily business users to the technical "geek" crowd, some of whom migrated over from Byte Magazines Bix online service.

There were special forums, special groups, but many had "relatively large premiums" (as did "some premium data bases" with charges of "$7.50 each time you enter a search request.")

In 1992, CompuServe hosted the first known WYSIWYG e-mail content and forum posts. Fonts, colors and emoticons were encoded into 7-bit text-based messages via the third party product NavCIS (Dvorak Development) running on DOS and Windows 3.1, and later, Windows 95 operating systems.  NavCIS included features for offline work, similar to offline readers used with bulletin board systems, allowing users to connect to the service and exchange new mail and forum content in a largely automated fashion. Once the "run" was complete, the user edited their messages locally while offline. The system also allowed interactive navigation of the system to support services like the chat system. Many of these services remained text based.

CompuServe later introduced CompuServe Information Manager (CIM) to compete more directly with AOL. Unlike Navigator, CIM was tuned for online work, and used a point-and-click interface very similar to AOLs. Later versions interacted with the hosts using the  HMI communications protocol. For some areas of the service which did not support HMI, the older text-based interface could be used. WinCIM also allowed caching of forum messages, news articles and e-mail, so that reading and posting could be performed offline, without incurring hourly connect costs. Previously, this was a luxury of the NavCIS, AutoSIG and TapCIS applications for power users.

One of the big advantages of CIS over the Internet was that the users could purchase services and software from other CompuServe members using their CompuServe account. At this time, the Internet backbone was operated by NSFNET, and use of Internet accounts for commercial activity was prohibited.

During the early 1990s the hourly rate fell from over $10 per hour to $1.95 per hour. In March 1992, it launched online signups with credit card based payments and a desktop application to connect online and check emails. In April 1995, CompuServe topped three million members, still the largest online service provider, and launched its NetLauncher service, providing WWW access capability via the Spry Mosaic browser. AOL, however, introduced a far cheaper flat-rate, unlimited-time, advertisement-supported price plan in the US to compete with CompuServe's hourly charges. In conjunction with AOL's marketing campaigns, this caused a significant loss of customers until CompuServe responded with a similar plan of its own at $24.95 per month in late 1997.

As the World Wide Web grew in popularity with the general public, company after company closed their once-busy CompuServe customer support forums to offer customer support to a larger audience directly through company websites, an area which the CompuServe forums of the time could not address because they had not yet introduced universal WWW access.

In 1992, CompuServe acquired Mark Cuban's company, MicroSolutions, for $6 million.

AOL's entry into the PC market in 1991 marked the beginning of the end for CIS. AOL charged $2.95 an hour versus $5.00 an hour for CompuServe. AOL used a freely available GUI-based client; CompuServe's wasn't free, and it only supported a subset of the system's functionality. In response, CIS lowered its hourly rates on several occasions. Subsequently, AOL switched to a monthly subscription instead of hourly rates, so for active users AOL was much less expensive. By late 1994, CompuServe was offering "unlimited use of the standard services (including news, sports, weather) ... and limited electronic mail" for $8.95 per month  what The New York Times called "probably the best deal."

CIS's number of users grew, peaking in April 1995 at 3 million worldwide. By this point AOL had over 20 million users in the United States alone, but this was off their peak of 27 million, due to customers leaving for lower-cost offerings. By 1997 the number of users leaving all online services for dialup Internet service providers was reaching a climax.

In 1997, CompuServe began converting its  forums from its proprietary Host-Micro Interface (HMI) to HTML web standards. The 1997 change discontinued text based access to the forums, but the forums were accessible both through the web as well as through CompuServe's proprietary HMI protocol. In 2004 CompuServe discontinued HMI and converted the forums to web access only. The forums remained active on CompuServe.com until the end of 2017.

Acquisitions 
CompuServe made a number of acquisitions in its history, both before and after being acquired by H&R Block:

 Early 1970s  Alpha Systems of Dallas, Texas, a small regional timesharing company which was also based on PDP-10 technology.  It was operated as a standalone company for a short time, but later their PDP-10 was moved to CompuServe's Columbus, Ohio, datacenter and the Dallas operation shut down
 ~1986  Software House  developer of System 1022, a relational database system
 ~1986  Collier-Jackson  developer of human resource management products
 1988  Access Technology  developer of the 20/20 spreadsheet program
 1995  Spry, Inc.  developer of Internet in a Box, the first consumer Internet suite.

CompuServe UK
Before the widespread adoption of the Internet and World Wide Web, the United Kingdom's first national major-brands online shopping service was developed by the UK arm of CompuServe/CIS as part of its proprietary closed-system collection of consumer services.

Andrew Gray set up CompuServe UK's operations as the European arm of the US company back in the late 1980s and later became the company's European general manager, while David Gilroy was CompuServe's UK director of customer services. The service continued to grow and offered technical support managed by Suzanne Gautier and sales managed by Colin Campbell.

The service was proposed by Paul Stanfield, an independent business-to-consumer electronic commerce consultant, to Martin Turner, Product Marketing Director for CIS UK, in August 1994. Turner agreed and the project started in September with rapid market research, product development and sales of online space to major UK retail and catalogue companies. These included WH Smith, Tesco, Virgin/Our Price, Great Universal Stores/GUS, Interflora, Dixons Retail, Past Times, PC World (retailer) and Innovations.

The service launched on Thursday April 27, 1995, with Paul Stanfield's purchase of a book from the WH Smith shop. This was a repeat of the first formal test of the service on February 9, 1995, which included secure payment and subsequent fulfilment of the order by Royal Mail postal delivery. Interactive Media in Retail Group (IMRG), the UK's industry association for e-retailing, believes that the UK's first national shopping service secure online transaction was the purchase of a WH Smith book from the CompuServe centre.

Approximately 1,000,000 UK customers had access to the shops at that time and it was British retailers' first major exposure to the medium. Other retailers joined the service soon after and included Sainsbury's Wine and Jaguar Cars (branded lifestyle goods).

CompuServe UK commissioned writer Sue Schofield to produce a 'retail' pack including a new UK CompuServe Book and a free CD-ROM containing the CIS software to access the service.

CompuServe, with its closed private network system, was slow to react to the rapid development of the open World Wide Web and it was not long before major UK retailers started to develop their own web sites independently of CompuServe.

User IDs and e-mail addresses
The original CompuServe user IDs consisted of seven octal digits in the form 7xxxx,xx – a legacy of PDP-10 architecture – (later eight and nine octal digits in the form 7xxxx,xxx  and 7xxxx,xxxx and finally ten octal digits in the form 1xxxxx,xxxx) that were generated in advance and issued on printed "Snap Paks".

From 1989, CompuServe users had email access to the Internet, using their user ID in the form xxxxx.xxxx@compuserve.com – where the comma in the original ID was replaced with a period. In 1996, users were allowed to create an alias for their Internet e-mail address, which could also be used for a personal web page; the longest-term members were allowed first choice of the new addresses. In 1998, users were offered the option of switching their mailbox to a newer system that provided POP3 access via the Internet, so that any Internet mail program could be used. Current CompuServe email addresses look like XXXXXX@cs.com for users of the CompuServe 2000 service.

Custom portals
CompuServe has a long history offering a custom portal of the CompuServe Information Service to the airline industry. Beginning in the 1970s, CompuServe offered a customized version of its service that allows pilots and flight attendants to bid for flight schedules with their airline. CompuServe offered customized solutions to other industries as well, including a service called CompuServe for Lawyers; another was "the African-American Culture and Arts Forum."

As part of CompuServe 2000, another customized portal made "a 2-year deal ... with WebMD, an Internet healthcare startup for physicians and consumers."

Market share

Long the largest online service provider, by 1987 CompuServe had 380,000 subscribers, compared to 320,000 at the Dow Jones News/Retrieval, 80,000 at The Source, and 70,000 at GEnie.

CompuServe had 3 million worldwide users at its peak, compared to AOL's 27 million. By early 1999, many home users had switched to standard dial-up Internet access, and CompuServe had slipped to "2 million largely business professional users."

Technology and law
One popular use of CompuServe in the 1980s was file exchange, particularly pictures. Indeed, in 1985 it hosted perhaps the first online comic in the world, Witches and Stitches. CompuServe introduced a simple black-and-white image format known as RLE (run-length-encoding) to standardize the images so they could be shared among different microcomputer platforms. With the introduction of more powerful machines, universally supporting color, CompuServe introduced the much more capable GIF format, invented by Steve Wilhite. GIF went on to become the de facto standard for 8-bit images on the Internet in the early and mid-1990s.

CompuServe, and its outside telecommunications attorney, Randy May, led the appeals before the Federal Communications Commission (FCC) to exempt data networks from having to pay the Common Carrier Access Charge (CCAC) that was levied by the telephone Local Exchange Carriers (primarily the Baby Bell companies) on long-distance carriers. The primary argument was that data networking was a brand new industry, and the country would be better served by not exposing this important new industry to the aberrations of the voice telephone economics (the CCAC is the mechanism used to subsidize the cost of local telephone service from long-distance revenue). The FCC agreed with CompuServe's position, and the consequence is that all dial-up networking in the United States, whether on private networks or the public Internet, is much less expensive than it otherwise would have been.

Legal cases
In 1991, CompuServe was sued for defamation in one of the early cases testing the application of traditional law on the Internet in Cubby v. CompuServe. Although defamatory content was posted on one of its forums, CompuServe was not liable for this content because it was unaware of the content and did not exercise editorial control over the forum.

A November 1993 copyright infringement lawsuit regarding "about 900 songs" was settled two years later with payment, to be divided "among publishers whose songs were involved."

In 1995, CompuServe blocked access to sex-oriented newsgroups after being pressured by Bavarian prosecutors. In 1997, after CompuServe reopened the newsfeeds, Felix Somm, the former managing director for CompuServe Germany, was charged with violating German child pornography laws because of the material CompuServe's network was carrying into Germany.

He "was first convicted, in November 1997" and after another hearing sentenced to two years' probation on May 28, 1998. He was cleared on appeal on November 17, 1999.

See also 
 CompuServe Inc. v. Cyber Promotions, Inc.
 CompuServe, Inc. v. Patterson

WOW! (online service) 

    
Wow! (styled WOW!) was an online service run by CompuServe,  starting in March 1996; its closure was announced by November of the same year, to be effective at the end of January 1997.

Among the promised features were "the first Internet service to be offered with a monthly 'unlimited' rate ($17.95)." Software bugs, random shutdowns of the service, and loss of email messages, limited the service to a small, but very loyal fan base. It closed January 31, 1997.

Post shutdown Wow! history
Several class-action lawsuits were filed, claiming that WOW! was sold to stockholders with false and misleading information. Wow! was supposed to make the company competitive with AOL – "a proprietary service aimed at families and novice computer users." The Wow! Information Service, announced in late 1995, was supposed to commence with Microsoft Windows 95 SR2, the first to include Internet Explorer. Knowing that bundling their browser would be considered anti-competitive, Microsoft also planned to bundle installers for several major ISPs into Windows, but CompuServe's software was not ready.

Wow.com domain
AOL retained the wow.com domain name after it acquired CompuServe, and kept it dormant from the shut-down of Wow! until 2007. In mid-2007, AOL considered moving its Digg-style news aggregator, then hosted at Netscape.com, to wow.com, before ultimately moving it to Propeller.com. Toward the end of the year, AOL was reportedly working on using the domain for a social networking service focused on the popular online role-playing game World of Warcraft.

From October 2010 until its 2015 shut-down, some of that was moved to a subdomain of Joystiq. The wow.com domain was simultaneously relaunched as a deal of the day site similar to Groupon. However, that site was also short-lived, shutting down in late 2011.

As of January 2019, wow.com is a search engine powered by Bing, using the same back-end as AOL Search, which is now part of Oath Inc.

WorldCom acquisition and deal with AOL

The battle for customers between AOL and CompuServe became one of handing customers back and forth, using free hours and other enticements. There were technical problems—the thousands of new generation U.S. Robotics dialup modems deployed in the network would crash under high call volumes. For the first time in decades, CompuServe began losing money, and at a prodigious rate. An effort, code-named "Red-Dog", was initiated to convert CompuServe's long-time PDP-10 based technologies over to servers based on Intel x86 architectures and the Microsoft Windows NT operating system.

Parent H&R Block was going through its own management changes at the same time, beginning with the retirement of CEO Henry Bloch. A series of successors ensued. In 1997, H&R Block announced its intention to divest itself of CompuServe. A number of potential buyers came to the forefront, but the terms they offered were unacceptable to management. AOL, the most likely buyer, made several offers to purchase CompuServe using AOL stock, but H&R Block management sought cash, or at least a higher quality stock.

In February 1998, John W. Sidgmore, then vice chairman of WorldCom, and the former CEO of UUNET, devised a complex transaction which ultimately met the goals of all parties. Step one was that WorldCom purchased all the shares of CompuServe with $1.2 billion of WCOM stock. The next day, WorldCom sold the CompuServe Information Service portion of the company to AOL, retaining the CompuServe Network Services portion. AOL in turn sold its networking division, Advanced Network Services (ANS), to WorldCom. Sidgmore said that at this point the world was in balance: the accountants were doing taxes, AOL was doing information services, and WorldCom was doing networks.

WorldCom's newly acquired CompuServe Network Services was renamed WorldCom Advanced Networks, and continued to operate as a discrete company within WorldCom after being combined with AOL's network subsidiary, ANS, and an existing WorldCom networking company called Gridnet. In 1999, Worldcom acquired MCI and became MCI WorldCom, WorldCom Advanced Networks briefly became MCI WorldCom Advanced Networks. MCI WorldCom Advanced Networks was ultimately absorbed into UUNET. Soon thereafter, WorldCom began its spiral to bankruptcy, re-emerging as MCI. In 2006, MCI was sold to Verizon. As a result, the organization that had once been the networking business within CompuServe is now part of Verizon Business.

In the process of splitting CompuServe into its two major businesses, CompuServe Information Services and CompuServe Network Services, WorldCom and AOL both desired to make use of the CompuServe name and trademarks. Consequently, a jointly owned holding company was formed for no other purpose than to hold title to various trademarks, patents and other intellectual property, and to license that intellectual property at no cost to both WorldCom (now Verizon) and AOL.

In 2015, when Verizon acquired AOL, all of CompuServe's original properties were reunited under Verizon.

Post-AOL acquisition
In September 2003 CompuServe Information Service, which had become a division of AOL, added CompuServe Basic to its product lines, selling via Netscape.com.

CIS  was then positioned as the value market-provider for several million customers, as part of the AOL Web Products Group. Recent U.S. versions of the CompuServe client software—essentially an enhanced Web browser—used the Gecko layout engine (developed for Mozilla) within a derivative of the AOL client and using the AOL dialup network. The previous CompuServe service offering, re-branded as "CompuServe Classic", remained available in the US and also in other countries where CompuServe 2000 was not offered, such as the UK. In Germany, CompuServe 2000 was introduced in 1999 and withdrawn in 2001 because of failure on the German market, but CompuServe Classic service remained for a while. CompuServe Germany introduced its own products for dialup and DSL internet access, and its own client software (called CompuServe 4.5 light).

2007 and beyond
In January 2007, CompuServe e-mailed members that Windows Vista was not supported, and suggested switching to the AOL-branded service. Like many older programs, however, CompuServe client software can run under Windows Vista in compatibility mode. In July 2007, CompuServe Pacific announced cessation as of August 31, 2007. In September 2007, it was announced that CompuServe France would close down its operations on November 30, 2007. In the Pacific region (Australia, New Zealand, etc.) Fujitsu Australia ran the CompuServe Pacific franchise, which in 1998 had 35,000 customers. Towards the end of its operations in that area, it was thought to have far fewer because of CompuServe Pacific's pricing plans, which have not been changed since 1998 (e.g., A$14.95 for two hours per month). In July 2008, CompuServe Germany informed its customers that it would close down its operations on July 31, 2008. Its legacy service "CompuServe Classic" would not be affected by this decision.

CompuServe forums  are more tightly linked to CompuServe channels. Compuserve.com currently runs a slightly trimmed-down version of the now-defunct Netscape.com Web portal, the latter of which was shut down in 2006.

CompuServe announced on April 15, 2009, that CompuServe Classic would "no longer operate as an Internet Service Provider" and would close on June 30, 2009. All CompuServe Classic services, including OurWorld Web pages, were taken offline as of that date. CompuServe Classic e-mail users would be able to continue using their CompuServe e-mail addresses via a new e-mail system.

AOL used the CompuServe brand for CompuServe 2000 (a rebranded low-cost offering), which closed in 2011 (including Mac), and CompuServe Dialer (a low-cost dialup ISP that became a Web portal).

Closure of forums
CompuServe announced in November 2017 that the CompuServe Forums would be shut down on December 15, 2017. The closure came more than 36 years after the CompuServe Forums had begun in 1981. Some moved to Forumania or elsewhere.

CompuServe GUIs
Over time, there were several graphical user interfaces written for accessing CompuServe. Unlike what AOL gave for free, The New York Times wrote about them "which Compuserve ought to give away, but does not." Among their names were WinCIM, TapCIS and NavCIS.

At a time when subscribers paid for timed access (as well as long-distance calls in some countries) and had to spend time online reading and replying to messages, their goal was to bypass CompuServe's WinCim interface, and streamline sending all pre-written email and forum postings that the user had written offline, then receiving new messages, downloading requested files, and logging off CompuServe.

TapCIS
TapCIS (The Access Program for the Compuserve Information Service) was an automated MS-DOS-based software application that sped up access to, and management of, CompuServe email accounts and forum memberships for PC users from 1981 until 2004 when advances in CompuServe technology rendered it obsolete. It was described as "archaic-looking (but) .. remains a powerful tool for accessing CompuServe forums."

TapCIS was written in Borland's Turbo Pascal by Howard Benner, a marketing executive from Wilmington, Delaware, who joined CompuServe in 1981 and died of melanoma in June 1990, aged 44.

Since it was able to issue administrative commands, TapCIS was the preferred tool for dozens of CompuServe system operators (SysOps).

CIM and WinCIM
Regarding WinCIM (and predecessor CIM), PC Magazine wrote that "They give you a broader view of what's available" and by using it "you can more easily navigate the service." They explicitly caution that, unlike TapCIS, it  "won't save any money ... it could actually take you longer to retrieve and answer messages ... than without it."

OzCIS and OzWIN
Although OzCIS and OzWIN (its Windows-based successor) were described as "free for personal use" by PC Magazine, it was shareware, like WinCIM, TapCIS and NavCIS.

The programming was done by Steve Sneed using Pascal-like Delphi; the software was published by Ozarks West Software Inc.

Like TapCIS, it had SysOp features such as moving and deleting messages, administering the file libraries, and "flagging" users (giving/denying SysOp rights). Unlike other offline readers such as TapCIS and NavCIS, which added proprietary ways of formatting text (colors, fonts, attributes), OzWin always remained "plain text" and never displayed any custom styles.

In May 2005, CompuServe discontinued access the OzCis and TapCIS forums on CompuServe.

AutoSIG
AutoSIG was free, unlike WinCIM, TapCIS, NavCIS and OzCIS/OzWIN.

VisCIS
Visual CompuServe, also known as VisCIS, was a demo concept of a VRML-based client by programmer John D. Gwinner which modelled the CompuServe interface into a 3D virtual environment. It was later redeveloped by Gwinner into VisMenu, a general-purpose VRML menuing system.

See also
 CompuServe, Inc. v. Patterson, a case involving Patterson's software, which came first, and a "similar" offering from CompuServe
 FILe Generator and Editor
 VIDTEX

Notes

References

External links
 
 Aviation Special Interest Group
 CompuServe Interactive Services, Inc. History
 Interview with CompuServe Founder Jeff Wilkins
A Brief History of 36-bit Computing at CompuServe by Sandy Trevor
 the README file
 Unofficial TAPCIS website

 
1969 establishments in Ohio
1996 software
1997 disestablishments
1998 mergers and acquisitions
American companies established in 1969
Yahoo!
Companies based in the Columbus, Ohio metropolitan area
Computer companies established in 1969
Internet forums
Internet properties established in 1989
Internet service providers of the United States
Pascal (programming language) software
Pre–World Wide Web online services
Telecommunications companies established in 1969
Time-sharing companies
Windows Internet software